Saclofen is a competitive antagonist for the GABAB receptor. This drug is an analogue of the GABAB agonist baclofen. The GABAB receptor is heptahelical receptor, expressed as an obligate heterodimer, which couples to the Gi/o class of heterotrimeric G-proteins.  The action of saclofen on the central nervous system is understandably modest, because G-proteins rely on an enzyme cascade to alter cell behavior while ionotropic receptors immediately change the ionic permeability of the neuronal plasma membrane, thus changing its firing patterns. These particular receptors, presynaptically inhibit N- and P/Q- voltage-gated calcium channels (VGCCs) via a direct interaction of the dissociated beta gamma subunit of the g-protein with the intracellular loop between the 1st and 2nd domain of the VGCC's alpha-subunit; postsynaptically, these potentiate Kir currents. Both result in inhibitory effects. 

However, in animal experiments, saclofen is paradoxically observed to have an antiepileptic effect. This is probably because GABAB effect is coupled to excitation in the thalamo-cortical circuits — Kir coupling via Gβγ subunits is so strong that it lowers the threshold for T-type Ca2+ channel opening enough to elicit their opening, and thus an excitation in this circuit. Since thalamo-cortical circuit overfiring is seen in types of epilepsy involving absence seizures (ethosuximide, a T-type Ca2+ channel blocker, is used in the treatment of this), the unexpected antiepileptic effects of saclofen may thus be explained (unexpected as the GABA receptors are inhibitory, and antagonizing them should lead to hyperactivity of the affected neurons).  Possible therapeutic uses of saclofen are currently being researched.

Saclofen has two enantiomeric forms. The (R)-stereoisomer is the one that binds to the GABAB receptor, whereas the (S)-stereoisomer does not.

References

Chloroarenes
GABAB receptor antagonists
Sulfonic acids